Sandaun Province (formerly West Sepik Province) is the northwesternmost mainland province of Papua New Guinea. It covers an area of 35,920 km2 (13868 m2) and has a population of 248,411 (2011 census). The capital is Vanimo. In July 1998 the area surrounding the town Aitape was hit by an enormous tsunami caused by a Magnitude 7.0 earthquake which killed over 2,000 people. The five villages along the west coast of Vanimo towards the International Border are namely; Lido, Waromo, Yako, Musu and Wutung.

Name
Sandaun is a Tok Pisin word derived from English "sun down," since the province is located in the west of the country, where the sun sets. The province was formerly named West Sepik Province, for the Sepik River that flows through the province and forms part of the province's southern border.

Physical Geography 
The Sandaun Province has beaches along the northern coast, as well as mountainous areas throughout the province, primarily in the southern area of the province. Several rivers flow throughout the province, most notable the Sepik River. The area, like much of Papua New Guinea, is prone to earthquakes, tsunamis, and volcanic eruptions.

Districts and LLGs
There are four districts in the province. Each district has one or more Local Level Government (LLG) areas. For census purposes, the LLG areas are subdivided into wards and those into census units.

Provincial leaders

The province was governed by a decentralised provincial administration, headed by a Premier, from 1978 to 1995. Following reforms taking effect that year, the national government reassumed some powers, and the role of Premier was replaced by a position of Governor, to be held by the winner of the province-wide seat in the National Parliament of Papua New Guinea.

Premiers (1978–1995)

Governors (1995–present)

Members of the National Parliament

The province and each district is represented by a Member of the National Parliament. There is one provincial electorate and each district is an open electorate.

References

External links

 
Provinces of Papua New Guinea
Momase Region